Luis Humberto Gonzalez (born January 17, 1992) is a Dominican professional baseball pitcher for the Acereros de Monclova of the Mexican League. He previously played for Chunichi Dragons in the Nippon Professional Baseball (NPB) in  2020. He also played in the minor leagues for the Philadelphia Phillies, Baltimore Orioles and San Francisco Giants.

Career

Chunichi Dragons
On December 12, 2019, it was announced that González had agreed to one-year deal with the Chunichi Dragons of Nippon Professional Baseball. González appeared in 28 games for Chunichi’s main team, posting a 4.78 ERA with 27 strikeouts in 26.1 innings pitched. He became a free agent on December 2, 2020.

Fortitudo Baseball
For the 2022 season, González signed with Fortitudo Baseball of the Italian Baseball League. In 10 games for the team, González worked to an 0-1 record and 2.01 ERA with 40 strikeouts and 8 saves in 22.1 innings pitched.

Acereros de Monclova
On March 6, 2023, González signed with the Acereros de Monclova of the Mexican League.

References

External links

Dragons.jp

1992 births
Living people
Bowie Baysox players
Chunichi Dragons players
Delmarva Shorebirds players
Dominican Republic expatriate baseball players in Japan
Dominican Republic expatriate baseball players in the United States
Dominican Summer League Orioles players
Estrellas Orientales players
Frederick Keys players
Florida Complex League Phillies players
Nippon Professional Baseball pitchers
Norfolk Tides players
People from Valverde Province
Salt River Rafters players
Williamsport Crosscutters players